Cláudio Biekarck (born 16 May 1951) is a Brazilian former sailor. He competed at the 1972 Summer Olympics, the 1976 Summer Olympics and the 1980 Summer Olympics.

References

External links
 
 

1951 births
Living people
Brazilian male sailors (sport)
Olympic sailors of Brazil
Sailors at the 1972 Summer Olympics – Finn
Sailors at the 1976 Summer Olympics – Finn
Sailors at the 1980 Summer Olympics – Finn
Pan American Games medalists in sailing
Pan American Games silver medalists for Brazil
Sailors at the 2019 Pan American Games
Medalists at the 2019 Pan American Games
Sportspeople from São Paulo
20th-century Brazilian people